The Vancouver Ravens were the original Vancouver National Lacrosse League (NLL) franchise from 2002 to 2004. The team played their home games at General Motors Place, now Rogers Arena, in Vancouver, British Columbia, Canada. At the conclusion of their three-year lease at GM Place, they were unable to secure an extension with GM Place nor able to negotiate with Pacific Coliseum. Combined with a lack of attendance due to unstable ownership, on December 14, 2004, the NLL announced that the Ravens would cease operations and not be playing in the 2005 NLL season.

On June 18, 2007, a bid was submitted to the NLL for the return of the Vancouver Ravens for the 2008 season. The bid that was submitted to the NLL was approved on the condition that an arena lease is obtained and 2,500 season tickets are sold.

On July 16, 2007, there was confirmation that the Vancouver Ravens could play in the 2008 season at GM Place. On July 19, 2007, contrary to earlier reports, the NLL announced that the Vancouver Ravens would not play in the 2008 season.

On August 26, 2008, retired Olympic Boxer and bronze medallist Dale Walters, along with Jeff Hughes, applied to return professional lacrosse back to Vancouver through the purchase and relocation of the Portland Lumberjax.

Since the folding of the Ravens franchise, the National Lacrosse League has returned to British Columbia in the form of the Vancouver Warriors, who play out of Rogers Arena in Vancouver. The franchise was formerly named the Washington Stealth and played in Everett, Washington, before relocating to Langley, BC in 2013, and then to Vancouver in 2018.

Awards and honours

All time record

Playoff results

References

Defunct National Lacrosse League teams
Rav
Lacrosse clubs established in 2002
Lacrosse clubs disestablished in 2004
2002 establishments in British Columbia
2004 disestablishments in British Columbia